The Saturday Starship is a British Saturday morning children's series that was produced by Central Television and aired on the ITV network. There was one series of 21 editions between 1 September 1984 and 26 January 1985 hosted by Tommy Boyd, Bonnie Langford and Nigel Roberts. It was a follow-up to The Saturday Show and TISWAS.  Chris Baines presented one of the first environmental strands on children's TV in the UK, and this led to The Ark series in 1988.

External links
 
 The Saturday Starship on Paul Morris' SatKids

1984 British television series debuts
1985 British television series endings
1980s British children's television series
English-language television shows
ITV children's television shows
Television series by ITV Studios
Television shows produced by Central Independent Television